Indescribable may refer to:

 "Indescribable" (song), a song written and recorded by Christian singer-songwriter Laura Story and later also recorded by Christian musician Chris Tomlin
 Indescribable (film), a film based on the events surrounding the writing of the hymn, "The Love of God"
 Indescribable (horse), an American Thoroughbred racehorse and winner of the 2009 Kentucky Cup Distaff Stakes

See also 
 Indescribable cardinal, a term used in mathematics to describe a certain kind of large cardinal number that is hard to describe in some language Q
 The Indescribable Wow, the fifth (studio) album from American singer-songwriter Sam Phillips